Palis Rah may refer to:
 Palis Rah, Markazi